The 2017 Arab Youth Athletics Championships was the sixth edition of the international athletics competition for under-18 athletes from Arab countries. Organised by the Arab Athletic Federation, it took place in Radès, Tunisia from 2–4 November. A total of forty events were contested, of which 20 by male and 20 by female athletes.

Medal summary

Men

Women

Medal table

Participation

References

Results
Arab u18 championships, Rades (Tunisia) 2-4/11/2017. Africathle. Retrieved 2019-07-09.

Arab Youth Athletics Championships
International athletics competitions hosted by Tunisia
Sports competitions in Radès
Arab Youth Athletics Championships
Arab Youth Athletics Championships
Arab Youth Athletics Championships